Brembodus is an extinct genus of extinct pycnodontid of the Late Triassic of Cene, Italy. It is the type genus of the family Brembodontidae.

See also

 Gibbodon
 Pycnodontiformes
 Prehistoric fish
 List of prehistoric bony fish

References

Pycnodontiformes genera
Triassic bony fish
Fossils of Italy